Meserkhan (also Romanized as Meşerkhān; also known as Mesterkhān) is a village in Miyan Darband Rural District, in the Central District of Kermanshah County, Kermanshah Province, Iran. At the 2006 census, its population was 74, in 16 families.

References 

Populated places in Kermanshah County